A kampong (kampung in Malay and Indonesian) is the term for a village in Brunei, Indonesia, Malaysia and Singapore and a "port" in Cambodia. The term applies to traditional villages, especially of the indigenous people, and has also been used to refer to urban slum areas and enclosed developments and neighbourhoods within towns and cities in Brunei, Indonesia, Malaysia, Singapore, Cambodia, Sri Lanka and Christmas Island. The traditional kampong village designs and architecture have been targeted for reform by urbanists and modernists and have also been adapted by contemporary architects for various projects.

Brunei 

In Brunei, the term kampong (also kampung) primarily refers to the third- and lowest-level subdivisions after districts and mukim (equivalent to subdistrict). Some kampong divisions are sufficiently villages by anthropological definition or in its traditional sense, while others may only serve for census and other administrative purposes. There are also some which have been incorporated as part of the capital Bandar Seri Begawan and a few towns.

Because many kampongs have predominantly Muslim residents, each may also have a mosque for the Jumu'ah or Friday prayers, as well as a school providing the Islamic religious primary education compulsory for Muslim pupils in the country.

Both "kampong" and "kampung" are used with equal tendency in written media as well as in official place names. For example, Keriam, a village in Tutong District, is known as 'Kampung Keriam' by the Survey Department but 'Kampong Keriam' by the Postal Services Department — both are government departments.

Indonesia 

However, most of Indonesian cities and towns are initially consists of a collection of  settlements.  also usually refers to a settlement or compound of certain ethnic community, which later become the names of places. Such as the  district in East Jakarta,  (Buginese village),  (also known as ) refer to Tionghoa village or could be equivalent to Chinatown as well,  (Ambonese village),  (Javanese village),  (Arabs village), etc.

In the island of Sumatra and its surrounding islands, the indigenous peoples have distinctive architecture and building type features including longhouses and rice storage buildings in their s. Malays, Karo, Batak, Toba, Minangkabau and others have communal housing and tiered structures.

The term  in Indonesia could refer to the business-based village as well, as example  (lit. "the Chocolate village") in Blitar, East Java which mainly produced and sell the chocolates (bars, candies, powders, coffee, cocoa butter, etc.) from the local cacao farmers,  (lit. "the Arts (and Performances) village") in various places across Indonesia that mainly focused to produce and sell the local arts from the local artists,  (lit. In 2009, several  in collaboration with the other official entities (mainly Batik Museum) in Pekalongan, Central Java recognized by the UNESCO regarding the "Education and training in Indonesian Batik intangible cultural heritage for elementary, junior, senior, vocational school and polytechnic students" as Masterpiece of Oral and Intangible Heritage of Humanity in Register of Good Safeguarding Practices List.

All the terms are equivalent as "the leader of " with slightly differentiation. All terms are equivalent as "the leader of s" with slight differences.

Malaysia 
In Malaysia, a kampung is determined as a locality with 10,000 or fewer people. Since historical times, every Malay village came under the leadership of a penghulu (village chief), who has the power to hear civil matters in his village (see Courts of Malaysia for more details).

A Malay village typically contains a mosque or surau, paddy fields or orchards and wooden Malay houses on stilts. It is common to see a cemetery near the mosque. There's barely any proper roads, but just regular dirt roads for village people to travel between kampongs.

The British initiated the Kampong Baru ("New Village") program as a way to settle Malays into urban life. Malaysia's long serving prime minister Mahathir Mohamad lauded urban lifestyles in his book The Malay Dilemma and associated kampong village life with backward traditionalism. He also had the kampung sentiggan (squatter settlements) cleared and new buildings constructed to house them.

Singapore
The native Malay kampung are found in Singapore, but there are few kampung villages remaining, mostly on islands surrounding Singapore, such as Pulau Ubin. In the past, there were many kampung villages in Singapore but development and urbanization have replaced them. Development plans for Kampong Glam have been controversial. Singapore is also home to Kampong Buangkok, featured in the film The Last Kampong.

See also
Barangay
Mukim
Rural area
Village

References

Names of places in Asia
Squatting